Niels Christian Oskar Nørland (4 October 1882 in Roskilde – 18 May 1941 in Frederiksberg, Copenhagen) was a Danish amateur football (soccer) player, who played 14 games as a forward for the Denmark national football team and won silver medals at the 1908 and 1912 Summer Olympics. He also won a gold medal at the unofficial 1906 Summer Olympics. Nørlund played his entire career with Copenhagen club KB, with whom he won several Danish football championships.

He was selected for the unofficial Danish national team at the 1906 Summer Olympics in Athens, which Denmark went on to win. He played in Denmark's first official national team game at the 1908 Summer Olympics, where he played two games as Denmark won silver medals. Four years later, he played another two games at the 1912 Summer Olympics, as Denmark won silver yet again. He ended his Danish national team career in October 1916, having played 14 games, though scoring no goals despite his forward position.

On 6 February 1914, he left the folk church; he married Julÿette Frederikke Jenny Fischer on 21 February 1914, and changed his last name on 24 February 1914.

References

External links
Danish national team profile
DatabaseOlympics profile

1882 births
1941 deaths
Danish men's footballers
Kjøbenhavns Boldklub players
Denmark international footballers
Footballers at the 1906 Intercalated Games
Footballers at the 1908 Summer Olympics
Footballers at the 1912 Summer Olympics
Olympic footballers of Denmark
Olympic silver medalists for Denmark
People from Roskilde
Olympic medalists in football
Medalists at the 1912 Summer Olympics
Medalists at the 1908 Summer Olympics
Association football forwards
Sportspeople from Region Zealand